William John Burns (born August 30, 1989) is an American former professional baseball center fielder. He played in Major League Baseball (MLB) for the Oakland Athletics and Kansas City Royals.

Career

Amateur
Burns attended George Walton Comprehensive High School in Marietta, Georgia, and Mercer University. In 2011, he played collegiate summer baseball with the Harwich Mariners of the Cape Cod Baseball League.

Washington Nationals
He was drafted by the Washington Nationals in the 32nd round of the 2011 Major League Baseball Draft, and started the 2013 season with the Potomac Nationals but was promoted to the Double-A Harrisburg Senators during the season. Burns hit .315/.425/.383 and stole 74 bases between the two levels. After the season, he was named the Nationals Minor League Player of the Year.

Oakland Athletics
On December 11, 2013, the Nationals traded Burns to the Oakland Athletics for Jerry Blevins. Burns hit .250/.333/.330, with 51 stolen bases, before being called up to the majors from the Double-A Midland RockHounds on July 28, 2014. 

On May 24, 2015 he hit his first MLB home run against Tampa Bay Rays, when he swung on the first pitch of the game. In 2015 he batted 294/.334/.392 with 26 stolen bases, and led the majors in percentage of soft-hit batted balls (31.0%).

Kansas City Royals
On July 30, 2016, the Athletics traded Burns to the Kansas City Royals for Brett Eibner. The Royals designated him for assignment on February 28, 2018. He cleared waivers and was outrighted to the Triple-A Omaha Storm Chasers. He elected free agency on November 3, 2018.

New York Yankees
On January 4, 2019, the Yankees signed Burns to a minor league contract. He received a non-roster invitation to spring training in 2019. He became a free agent following the 2019 season.

Retirement
As of July 15, 2020, Burns had retired from Baseball and become a real estate agent.

Personal life
His sister, Abbey, is a member of the U.S. Paralympic Swim Team.

References

External links

Mercer Bears bio
MILB stats

1989 births
Living people
Baseball players from Atlanta
Baseball players from Marietta, Georgia
Major League Baseball center fielders
Oakland Athletics players
Kansas City Royals players
Mercer Bears baseball players
Harwich Mariners players
Auburn Doubledays players
Hagerstown Suns players
Potomac Nationals players
Harrisburg Senators players
Midland RockHounds players
Sacramento River Cats players
Nashville Sounds players
Omaha Storm Chasers players
Scranton/Wilkes-Barre RailRiders players